The Drexel Dragons women's basketball program represents intercollegiate women's basketball at Drexel University. The team currently competes in the Colonial Athletic Association in Division I of the National Collegiate Athletic Association (NCAA) and play home games at the Daskalakis Athletic Center in Philadelphia, Pennsylvania.

History

Drexel women's basketball began in 1887, and the first officially organised team began playing in 1909. The first intercollegiate season began in 1921, playing their first game against Swarthmore College. The first games were played at the 33rd Street Armory. The Dragons joined Division I in 1982. In the 1980s, the team nickname changed from the Dragonettes to the Dragons.

Drexel accomplished two consecutive undefeated seasons in 1965–66 and 1966–67.  Both teams finished with a record of 8–0.

Drexel has received one bid to the NCAA Women's Basketball tournament, occurring in 2009. Drexel's women's basketball team won their first national title in 2013, winning the NIT Tournament.

On February 22, 2007, Drexel defeated Northeastern 98–90 in an NCAA Division I record five overtimes.

Postseason results

NCAA Division I tournament results
The Dragons have appeared in the NCAA Division I tournament two times. Their combined record is 0–2.

WNIT results
The Dragons have appeared in the Women's National Invitation Tournament (WNIT) ten times, winning it in 2013. Their combined record is 11–9.

Honors

Retired jerseys
Drexel has retired two jersey numbers.

Coach of the Year
Colonial Athletic Association Coach Of The Year
 2005 Denise Dillon (co-winner)
 2009 Denise Dillon
 2018 Denise Dillon
 2021 Amy Mallon

Player of the Year
East Coast Conference Player of the Year
 1983 Ethelda Makoid
 1988 Barbara Yost

America East Conference Player of the Year
 2001 Michelle Maslowski

Colonial Athletic Association Player of the Year
 2009 Gabriela Mărginean
 2019 Bailey Greenberg
 2023 Keishana Washington

Rookie of the Year
East Coast Conference Rookie of the Year
 1990 Debbie Lynn

America East Conference Rookie of the Year
 1994 Jen MacNeil (formerly North Atlantic Conference)
 2001 Katrina Martin

Colonial Athletic Association Rookie of the Year
 2003 Catherine Scanlon
 2007 Gabriela Mărginean
 2018 Hannah Nihill

Defensive Player of the Year
East Coast Conference Defensive Player of the Year
 1989–90 – Debbie Ponist

Colonial Athletic Association Defensive Player of the Year
 2020–21 – Hannah Nihill

Women's National Invitation Championship All Tournament MVP
 2013 Hollie Mershon

Philadelphia Sports Writers Association
''See: 
Most Courageous
 2008 – Nicole Hester

Outstanding Amateur Athlete
 2009 – Gabriela Mărginean

Special Achievement
 2013 – Denise Dillon

See also
 Drexel Dragons men's basketball

References

External links